Van Humphries (born 8 January 1976 in Moree, New South Wales) is an Australian  rugby union player for the Queensland Reds in the Super Rugby competition.

Career
Humphries returned to Australia in 2007 and played for the Western Sydney Rams in the ill-fated Australian Rugby Championship and was the form lock of the competition until a broken leg cut his season short. Humphries is currently into his third stint at the Queensland Reds and also played for clubs in Italy and Japan as well as playing for New South Wales Waratahs for many seasons and he has represented Australia A.

References

External links
Reds Profile
itsrugby.co.uk Profile

1976 births
Living people
Australian rugby union players
Rugby union locks
Queensland Reds players
New South Wales Waratahs players
People from the North West Slopes
Rugby Viadana players
Expatriate rugby union players in Italy
Rugby union players from New South Wales